J. Christopher Ackerley is an American politician and a former Republican member of the Arizona House of Representatives who represented District 2.

Education
Ackerley earned his degree from Northern Arizona University. He currently teaches high school physics and math at Amphitheater High School in Tucson.

Elections
 2018 Ackerley and fellow Republican Anthony Sizer were defeated by Democratic incumbents Hernández and Gabaldon in the general election.
 2016 Ackerley was defeated by Daniel Hernández Jr. and Democratic incumbent Rosanna Gabaldon in the general election.
2014 Ackerley ran unopposed in the Republican primary. Ackerley came in second behind Rosanna Gabaldón and ahead of Democratic incumbent Demion Clinco in the general election with 19,656 votes.
2012 Ackerley ran unopposed in the Republican primary. Ackerley came in third in the general election with 23,677 votes.

References

External links
 Official page at the Arizona State Legislature
 Profile at Ballotpedia

Place of birth missing (living people)
Year of birth missing (living people)
Living people
Republican Party members of the Arizona House of Representatives
Politicians from Phoenix, Arizona
21st-century American politicians
People from Sahuarita, Arizona
Northern Arizona University alumni
Schoolteachers from Arizona